The Upper Cayuga First Nation is a Cayuga First Nation in southern Ontario, and a member nation of the Six Nations of the Grand River. Its reserves include the shared reserves of Glebe Farm 40B and the Six Nations of the Grand River First Nation.

References

Cayuga
First Nations governments in Ontario